TVR Cluj is public regional TV station available in Transylvania and Maramureş. It is the first regional branch of Societatea Română de Televiziune (Romanian Television Company), broadcasting since 3 January 1990. It is also the first one to broadcast on its own frequency, starting 15 March 2009—however it still produces programmes for the national stations, TVR1, TVR2 and is a main contributor to TVR3 together with other public regional stations. Its headquarters are in Cluj-Napoca. TVR Cluj broadcasts mainly in the Romanian language, but also in Hungarian and other national minorities' languages (German, Rroma, Hebrew, Ukrainian etc.).

References

External links
 Official website
 TVR

Cluj-Napoca
Mass media in Cluj-Napoca
Television channels and stations established in 1990
1990 establishments in Romania
Television stations in Romania